1905 was a  political hardcore punk band from Washington, D.C., formed in 2000. The band featured dual male and female vocals, their music drew inspiration from a combination of early 1980s UK anarcho-punk bands such as Crass, Zounds, The Mob as well as folk and hardcore punk.  The band has been cited as a major influence on several bands including Defiance, Ohio and modern screamo acts like I Would Set Myself on Fire for You and post-hardcore band Pygmylush, among others.  The band broke up in 2005 after the release of their only album "Voice", released on Exotic Fever Records.

Discography 
Demo (2002)
Voice (2004)
1905 / Amanda Woodward split 7-inch (2004)

References

Punk rock groups from Washington, D.C.
Musical groups established in 2000
2000 establishments in Washington, D.C.
Musical groups disestablished in 2005